The 1909 Notre Dame Fighting Irish football team represented the University of Notre Dame during the 1909 college football season.

Schedule

References

Notre Dame
Notre Dame Fighting Irish football seasons
College football undefeated seasons
Notre Dame Fighting Irish football